Kubin Airport  is an airfield near Kubin, a village on Moa Island, one of the Torres Strait Islands in Queensland, Australia.

Facilities
It has one runway designated 11/29, which measures .

Airlines and destinations

See also
 List of airports in Queensland

References

Airports in Queensland
Torres Strait Islands communities